An assessor may be:
 Assessor (fish), a genus of fishes
 Assessor (law), the assistant to a judge or magistrate
 Assessor (Oxford), a senior officer of the University of Oxford
 Assessor (property), an expert who calculates the value of property
 Collegiate Assessor, a civil rank in Imperial Russia
 Assessor (Italy), a member of the executive board in Italian local government
 scabinus or its various derived offices, in English translation
 Assessor (horse)

See also 
 Possession (disambiguation)